Værløse Basket, also known as the Værløse Blue Hawks or VBBK, is a professional basketball team based in Horsholm, Denmark. The team plays in the Basketligaen, the highest tier of basketball in Denmark.

Honours
Basketligaen
Runners-up (1): 2000–01

Season by season

References

External links
Official website

Basketball teams in Denmark